Eva Steininger-Bludau (21 July 1951 – 9 June 2022) was a German politician.

A member of the Social Democratic Party of Germany, she served in the Landtag of North Rhine-Westphalia from 2010 to 2017.

Steininger-Bludau died on 9 June 2022 at the age of 70.

References

1951 births
2022 deaths
21st-century German women politicians
Social Democratic Party of Germany politicians
Members of the Landtag of North Rhine-Westphalia
People from Castrop-Rauxel